The 1960–63 Nordic Football Championship was the eighth tournament staged. Four Nordic countries participated: Denmark, Finland, Norway and Sweden. Sweden won the tournament, its sixth Nordic Championship win.

Results

1960

1961

1962

1963

Table
'Two points for a victory, one point for a draw, no points for a loss.

Winners

Statistics

Goalscorers

See also
 Balkan Cup
 Baltic Cup
 Central European International Cup
 Mediterranean Cup

References

External links
RSSSF archives

1960–63
1960–61 in European football
1961–62 in European football
1962–63 in European football
1960 in Swedish football
1961 in Swedish football
1962 in Swedish football
1963 in Swedish football
1960 in Danish football
1961 in Danish football
1962 in Danish football
1963 in Danish football
1960 in Norwegian football
1961 in Norwegian football 
1962 in Norwegian football 
1963 in Norwegian football
1960 in Finnish football
1961 in Finnish football
1962 in Finnish football
1963 in Finnish football